Ruedi Lustenberger (born 2 April 1950) is a Swiss politician and President of the Swiss National Council for 2013–2014.

Lustenberger was elected to the National Council in 1999, on the list of the Christian Democratic People's Party (CVP/PDC) in the Canton of Lucerne.

Lustenberger is a carpenter and contractor. He is married and has five children.

References

1950 births
Living people
People from Entlebuch District
Christian Democratic People's Party of Switzerland politicians
Members of the National Council (Switzerland)
Presidents of the National Council (Switzerland)